Ritterhude (Northern Low Saxon: Hu’e) is a municipality in the district of Osterholz, in Lower Saxony, Germany. It is situated on the river Hamme, approx. 6 km southwest of Osterholz-Scharmbeck, and 13 km northwest of Bremen.

Geography

Geographical location 
The natural landscape is characterized by extended fens, the alluvial wetlands and marshes of the Hamme River and the Wümme River lowlands together with the glacially formed landscape Geest with typically sandy and loamy soils.

Organization of the Municipality 
Since the reform of administration and reorganization of local government in 1974, today's municipality of Ritterhude was formed by the previously independent municipalities of Ritterhude (7.700 inhabitants), Platjenwerbe (2.300 inhabitants), Ihlpohl (2.000 inhabitants), Lesumstotel (800 inhabitants), Stendorf (600 inhabitants), and Werschenrege (400 inhabitants).

Transportation 
 The Ritterhude railway station is connected via S-Bahn to the Deutsche Bahn railway network.
 Ritterhude is conveniently located near the German Autobahn (Cuxhaven–Bremerhaven–Bremen–Walsrode) and Bundesstraße no. 74 (Bremen–Stade).

History 
First mention in 1182 in a document of the monastery of Osterholz. The house 'von der Hude' is being mentioned for the first time in a document in 1185. The castle 'Huda' was used in 1309 to protect the passage over the Hamme River at the 'Heerweg' from Hamburg to Bremen. The number of inhabitants increased from 52 families in the year 1568 to 89 in the year 1710. In 1757, both castle and bridge were destroyed during the Seven Years' War.

Ritterhude belonged to the Prince-Archbishopric of Bremen. In 1648, the Prince-Archbishopric was transformed into the Duchy of Bremen, which was first ruled in personal union by the Swedish and, from 1715 onwards, by the Hanoverian Crown. In 1823, the Duchy was abolished and its territory became part of the Stade Region.

References

Osterholz